MAX-3LIN-EQN is a problem in Computational complexity theory where the input is a system of linear equations (modulo 2).  Each equation contains at most 3 variables.  The problem is to find an assignment to the variables that satisfies the maximum number of equations.

This problem is closely related to the MAX-3SAT problem.  It is NP-hard to approximate MAX-3LIN-EQN with ratio (1/2 - δ) for any δ > 0.

See also
PCP (complexity)

References
Rudich et al., "Computational Complexity Theory,"
IAS/Park City Mathematics Series, 2004 page 108

J. Hastad.  "Some optimal inapproximability results."
In proceedings of the 29th ACM STOC, 1-10, 1997

NP-hard problems